HMS Atlas was a 91-gun second rate ship which was never completed and spent her entire service in reserve or as a hospital ship. She was launched in 1860, and lent to the Metropolitan Asylums Board for use as a hospital ship in 1881, and sold to them in 1885. Atlas served until 1904, when she was sold for breaking.

Description
She was to have been driven by a screw propeller. Had she been completed, her complement would have been 860 men.

History

The early years
She was built at Chatham Dockyard, Kent. Laid down in 1858, Atlas was one of the ships under construction at Chatham that were inspected by the Lords Commissioners of the Admiralty on 23 August 1859. Built on No. 6 Slip, Atlas was launched on 21 July 1860. The christening was performed by Mrs Schomberg, wife of Captain Schomberg. On 24 July, Atlas was taken to Sheerness to be fitted with her  steam engines. By April 1861, Atlas was undergoing trials under steam.

Atlas was initially earmarked for the Channel Fleet. Atlas was placed in reserve, in 1861 at Sheerness. She was reduced to 54 guns in 1870. In 1874, Atlas was transferred to Chatham Dockyard. She was totally disarmed in 1879.

Hospital ship
Atlas was to be converted into a hospital ship for 250 patients. A third hospital ship was the Castaliâ. The Metropolitan Asylums Board was to insure Atlas and Endymion for £11,000 and £8,000 respectively. There was opposition to the proposed use of Atlas from the Thames Conservancy and other public and private bodies. Agreement had been made to lease a berth at Deptford, Kent but when the managers of a company with premises nearby learned of the proposed use of Atlas as an isolation hospital, they put pressure on the owners of the berth with the result that the owners then decided not to allow Atlas to be berthed there.

She was initially stationed at Greenwich, Kent, in a berth which had been previously used for another hospital ship. This drew an objection from the shipbuilders Messrs Rennie because some of their employees refused to work near the riverside where Atlas was moored. It was also necessary to move Atlas and Endymion every time Rennie's launched a ship. Atlas was acquired by the board on 4 June, and Endymion on 5 July. Atlas housed 120 patients. In 1882, the Thames Conservancy wrote to the Metropolitan Asylums Board urging them to move Atlas and Endymion from Greenwich. The Thames Conservancy also called upon the board to pay a large claim for expenses incurred by Messrs Rennie's. At a meeting of the board, it was suggested that if moved, Atlas should be used for convalescent patients. The board decided to await the report from a Royal Commission into infectious diseases hospitals before deciding whether or not to move the ships.

In August 1882, Atlas was moved to nearby Deptford Creek, and in 1883 downstream to Long Reach, near Dartford. In February 1885, a meeting of the Metropolitan Asylums Board was informed that the Admiralty had stated that if the board wished to continue using Atlas and Endymion, they would have to purchase them at a cost of £8,400 and £6,500 respectively. The board replied that they would purchase the ships, but asked for the cost to be reduced.  In June, it was reported that the board were authorised to purchase both ships.  Following a fire on the training ship  in 1875, engines and a generator were installed on board Atlas in 1886 to provide the ship with electric light, given that oil lamps had been deemed a fire hazard. Atlas served as a hospital ship until 1904, when the new Joyce Green Hospital opened at Dartford, Kent. Atlas  was sold by auction in December, along with Endymion and Castaliâ for a total of £8,045. Atlas realised £3,725.

See also 
 Healthcare in London

References

External links 
 

1860 ships
Ships of the line of the Royal Navy
Hospital ships of the United Kingdom
Health in the Royal Borough of Greenwich
Merchant ships of the United Kingdom
Hospitals in Kent